The Military Police of the Armed Forces of Kazakhstan is the military police branch of the Republic of Kazakhstan. It falls under the direct command of the Main Directorate of the Military Police under the Ministry of Defense. The military police are special military units that are organizationally part of the armed forces and other security agencies to carry out the functions of ensuring law and order in these bodies just like the civilian police. 

The military police is under the joint jurisdiction of the Ministry of Defense, the Ministry of Internal Affairs and the National Security Committee, all of which manage the activities of the military police.

History
The first military police units were established in accordance with the directive of General of the army Mukhtar Altynbayev on March 6, 1997. Its purpose was to regulate military traffic, and maintain law and order in the Armed Forces, since military discipline is essential to ensure state national security. 

It was established in accordance with a presidential decree signed by President Nursultan Nazarbayev on 22 April 1997. This was done as part of a reform the system of national law enforcement agencies within Kazakhstan, which had only declared its independence six months before.  

Two years later, military police units were formed as part of the Border Service of the National Security Committee and the Internal Troops of Kazakhstan. Official rules and regulations were first brought into the military police in February 2005. In 2009, it was reported that as a result of the work carried out by the military police, the armed forces saw a more than 20% reduction in crime.

Tasks

The main tasks of the military police of Kazakhstan are:

To ensure law and order in the military
To implement internal control over the organization of the daily activities in garrison services in military units of the military
To detect and disclose of crimes and offenses within the framework of Kazakh law
To identify of circumstances contributing to the commission of crimes and offenses
To produce a pre-trial investigation in accordance with the criminal procedure legislation of the country
To ensure the road safety of vehicles of the national security agencies and the military
To detain servicemen in connection with violations of civilian and military law
To implement the use of relevant documents and state registration plates and conduct mandatory technical inspection of motor vehicles registered with the military police

In addition to the ones mentioned above, there are a couple more tasks that specifically pertain to the military police of the National Security Committee:

The investigation of criminal offenses committed by military personnel 
The protection of facilities of the NSC including warehouses that store weapons, special equipment, security systems and other technical means, as well as ensuring access control and internal facility regimes

Structure
Today, the Military Police of Kazakhstan consists of the following assets:.

4 military police units
16 regional divisions
4 divisions
Training Center for military police

Uniform

The overall uniform of the military police consists of the following variants:

Full dress uniform
Casual uniform
Combat uniform

All three have a summer and winter version to accommodate any type of weather. The dress uniform is black and consists of a peaked cap (or an ushanka during a winter) trousers, a black tie and a ceremonial belt of golden color, along with leather and white gloves. This uniform is worn during military parades and official functions. The casual uniform, which is worn on a daily basis, utilizes a Military beret and/or Papakha for headgear. The combat uniform consists of all camouflage clothing items, and is worn during regular duties.

Commanders
Major General Shamil Khakimov (?)
Major General Timur Dandybaev (2011-2017)
Colonel Marat Nurymbet (2020-present)

See also

 Military Police (Russia)

References

Military provosts
Military police
Military units and formations of Kazakhstan
Military units and formations established in 1997
1997 establishments in Kazakhstan
Gendarmerie
Kazakhstan